Providence Academy is a Christian school in Johnson City, Tennessee, serving grades K-12.

References 

Schools in Washington County, Tennessee